Swan 48 is a GRP constructed, fin keeled, masthead sloop or yawl designed by Sparkman & Stephens with a design number 2079 and manufactured by Nautor Oy. The original 48 was designed to rate under the I.O.R. and at the same time to offer the comforts of a great cruising boat. Because of this design criteria and its extremely strong structure Swan 48 suits very well for trans ocean racing as well as comfortable cruising and even circumnavigating the world. It was in production between 1971-1975 with 46 hulls built in total. It is not to be confused with a German Frers designed Swan 48 model which was in production between 1995-2003. The original S&S designed Swan 48 is famous for its two wins in the Newport-Bermuda Race; 'Noryema VIII' in 1972 and 'Constellation' in 1992. In the US market Swan 48 was also marketed as Palmer Johnson PJ48.

References

Keelboats
Sailing yachts
1970s sailboat type designs
Sailboat types built by Nautor Swan
Sailboat type designs by Olin Stephens
Sailboat type designs by Sparkman and Stephens